Sanchursky District is an administrative and municipal district (raion), one of the thirty-nine in Kirov Oblast, Russia. It is located in the southwest of the oblast. Its administrative center is the urban locality (an urban-type settlement) of Sanchursk. Population:  14,063 (2002 Census);  The population of Sanchursk accounts for 46.9% of the district's total population.

People
 Konstantin Vershinin (1900-1973)

References

Notes

Sources

Districts of Kirov Oblast